It's a Match is a Brazilian romantic comedy streaming television series that premiered on Globoplay on June 7, 2019. Starring Tatá Werneck and Eduardo Sterblitch, the series takes a comedic look at relationships through social media and dating apps.

Premise
Rita (Tatá Werneck) is always looking for a boyfriend and often resorting to dating apps for that. After a disastrous encounter, she meets Enzo (Eduardo Sterblitch) in a bar and the two perceive that they have many things in common – even bad luck at love.

Cast
 Tatá Werneck as Rita Lima
 Eduardo Sterblitch as Enzo Trindade
 Luis Lobianco as Valdir
 Clarice Falcão as Brita
 Júlia Rabello as Suzete
 Rafael Queiroga as Hélio
 Yara de Novaes as Dolores Lima

Episodes

References

External links
 
 

2010s Brazilian television series
2010s romantic comedy television series
2019 Brazilian television series debuts
Brazilian comedy television series
Globoplay original programming
Portuguese-language television shows
Television shows set in Rio de Janeiro (city)